Crete-Monee Community Unit School District 201 U, more commonly known as District 201-U, is a unified public school district located in Crete, Illinois, in the south suburbs of Chicago, Illinois in the Chicago metropolitan area., United States. It serves the communities of Crete, Monee, University Park and portions of Park Forest. The district provides education for children from Pre-Kindergarten through 12th Grade.

Schools
As of 2017, there are nine facilities in the district:
Balmoral Elementary
Coretta Scott King Magnet School
Crete Elementary
Crete-Monee High School
Crete-Monee Middle School
Early Learning Center
Monee Education Center
Monee Elementary
Talala Elementary

Structure
Students in the district attend kindergarten through fifth grade at local elementary schools. They then go to the Middle School, which houses sixth through eighth grades. Gifted students may apply to CSK Magnet School from kindergarten through fifth grade. All students attend Crete-Monee Middle School from sixth to eighth grade, and Crete-Monee High School from ninth to twelfth grade. High school students have the opportunity to take Advanced Placement courses at the high school for college credit and may also apply to and attend classes at Kankakee Community College or Prairie State College to earn dual credit.

References

External links
 

School districts in Will County, Illinois